The West Goshen Historic District is a historic district in the village of West Goshen in the town of Goshen, Connecticut.  It encompasses a well-preserved early 19th-century industrial village, with twenty historically significant properties in the village, most of which lie on Connecticut Route 4 between Beach Street and Thompson Road.  The district was listed on the National Register of Historic Places in 1987.

Description and history
The village of West Goshen, located west of the village center of Goshen on the Sharon Turnpike (Connecticut Route 4), was isolated and not developed until that road was built about 1770.  The area was recognized for the potential of its water power earlier, with a gristmill and sawmill standing on the banks of local waterways in the 1740s.  More development took place with the construction of a woolen mill in 1810, intended to process the output of Goshen's large sheep population.  This prompted the construction of worker housing for the mill employees, and a small village quickly arose.  The West Goshen Store, built in 1814, is one of the products of this period of growth.  The village declined around the time of the American Civil War, as water power began to be phased out for industrial works.

It is roughly bisected by a branch of the Marshepaug River, where its mill resources (none of which have survived in more than archaeological form) survive. Most of this area's buildings are residential and were built in the early decades of the 19th century, with Federal or Greek Revival style. There are some buildings that are older and some that date to the 1880s. Non-residential buildings include the former West Goshen Store (330 Rt. 4) and a former carding mill at 331 Rt. 4, built in 1818.

See also
Goshen Historic District
National Register of Historic Places listings in Litchfield County, Connecticut

References

Greek Revival architecture in Connecticut
Goshen, Connecticut
Federal architecture in Connecticut
Historic districts in Litchfield County, Connecticut
National Register of Historic Places in Litchfield County, Connecticut
Historic districts on the National Register of Historic Places in Connecticut